Yara Liz Lasanta Santiago (born April 3, 1986 in Barranquitas, Puerto Rico) is a Puerto Rican meteorologist and beauty pageant titleholder who participated and finished top 25 in Miss World 2010.

Early life
Prior to becoming Miss World Puerto Rico 2010, Lasanta was crowned Miss Teen International in 2001. She also competed in Nuestra Belleza Latina 2007, where she placed second runner-up to Alejandra Espinoza of Mexico. She competed in Miss Puerto Rico Universe 2005 where she finished 4th Runner-Up. Later, she competed in Miss Puerto Rico Universe 2007 where she finished up as 2nd Runner-Up. She currently TV anchor of Univision KMEX 34

Miss World Puerto Rico
Born in Barranquitas, Lasanta participated in Miss World Puerto Rico 2009, where she placed first runner-up to eventual winner, Jennifer Colón.

One year later, she was appointed by the national director of Miss Mundo de Puerto Rico as the official representative to Miss World 2010, held in Sanya, China.

Miss World 2010
In an event held at Mandarin Oriental, Sanya on October 19, 2010, Lasanta was named Miss World Beach Beauty, automatically becoming one of the semifinalists in Miss World 2010.

References 

1986 births
Living people
People from Barranquitas, Puerto Rico
Puerto Rican beauty pageant winners
Miss World 2010 delegates
Lasanta